The cream-winged cinclodes (Cinclodes albiventris) is a species of bird in the family Furnariidae. It is found throughout the Puna grassland from northwestern Argentina north through the Andes of Peru. Its natural habitats are subtropical or tropical high-altitude shrubland and grassland.

Gallery

References

cream-winged cinclodes
Birds of the Puna grassland
cream-winged cinclodes
cream-winged cinclodes
cream-winged cinclodes